The Haircut is a 1982 American short comedy film directed by Tamar Simon Hoffs. It was screened in the Un Certain Regard section at the 1983 Cannes Film Festival.

Cast
 John Cassavetes as Music Industry Executive
 Joyce Bulifant as Dell (Manicurist)
 Nicholas Colasanto as Bobby Russo (Barber)
 Meshach Taylor as Sam (Shoe Shine Man)
 Susanna Hoffs as Bobby Russo's Daughter (as The Bangs)
 Debbi Peterson as Bobby Russo's Daughter (as The Bangs)
 Victoria Peterson as Bobby Russo's Daughter (as The Bangs)
 Marji Mize as Bobby Russo's Daughter (as The Bangs)
 Robert Silvestro as Man in Towel
 Bob Russo as Real Barber
 Michael Barsimanto as Drummer
 Daniel Selby as Male Singer

References

External links

1982 films
1982 comedy films
Films directed by Tamar Simon Hoffs
American comedy short films
1980s English-language films
1980s American films